Peel—Dufferin—Simcoe was a federal electoral district represented in the House of Commons of Canada from 1968 to 1979. It was located in the province of Ontario. This riding was created in 1966 from parts of Peel—Dufferin riding.

It consisted of the Townships of Mono and Mulmur in the County of Dufferin, the Townships of Albion, Caledon, Chinguacousy and Toronto Gore in the County of Peel, and, in the county of Simcoe, the Town of Alliston and the Townships of Adjala, Tosorontio and Essa (excluding the Village of Cookstown), and the Town of Orangeville.

The electoral district was abolished in 1976 when it was redistributed between Brampton—Halton Hills, Dufferin—Wellington, Simcoe South and York—Peel ridings.

Members of Parliament

This riding has elected the following Members of Parliament:

Election results

|- 
  
|Liberal
|Bruce Beer 
|align="right"| 18,950   
  
|Progressive Conservative
|Ellwood Madill
|align="right"| 14,138    
 
|New Democratic
|George Hill
|align="right"|6,972   
|}

|- 
  
|Progressive Conservative
|Ellwood Madill
|align="right"| 25,663    
  
|Liberal
|Ross Milne
|align="right"| 20,759   
 
|New Democratic
|Stewart Smith
|align="right"| 9,061   
 
|Independent
|Douglas Ross Swackhammer 
|align="right"| 482   

|}

|- 
  
|Liberal
|Ross Milne
|align="right"| 27,299   
  
|Progressive Conservative
|Ellwood Madill
|align="right"| 22,754    
 
|New Democratic
|Don Fraser 
|align="right"|8,264   

|}

References

 Library of Parliament

Former federal electoral districts of Ontario
Politics of Brampton